Diego Armando Mayora Rengifo (born 1 February 1992) is a Peruvian professional footballer who plays as a centre-forward for Unión Comercio.

Club career
Mayora featured for Sport Loreto in the 2015 Torneo Descentralizado, after they won the 2014 Copa Perú. He scored four times, the first of which came against UT Cajamarca on 5 May, in sixteen matches as Sport Loreto were relegated. Mayora's last two goals came in a 5–2 loss away to Unión Comercio, a club that signed the forward in January 2016. Nineteen goals followed in eight months, including braces over Comerciantes Unidos, Deportivo Municipal, Defensor La Bocana and Melgar. In August 2016, Mayora joined Argentine Primera División side Colón. He made his bow in September versus Talleres.

That seventeen-minute cameo against Talleres was Mayora's only appearance for Colón, with him spending the majority of his time out on loan. Ahead of the 2017 campaign, Mayora signed for Deportivo Municipal. He was sent off twice across twenty-seven matches but still scored eleven goals as they finished ninth overall. Real Garcilaso completed the loan signing of Mayora in January 2018. He made his continental bow with the club, featuring in three Copa Libertadores matches. Mayora returned to Colón in June but left permanently in December and subsequently moved to UT Cajamarca in 2019.

In early 2020, after three goals in fourteen matches to end 2019 with Deportivo Coopsol, Mayora completed a move to Copa Perú team Manantay FC. He notched a hat-trick on debut against Sport Cahuide. In September, Mayora headed back to the Segunda División to rejoin Unión Comercio. His first appearance came in a defeat away to Chavelines Juniors on 27 October, which preceded his first goal arriving on 18 November against Santos.

International career
In 2016, Mayora was called up to the Pervian national team by Ricardo Gareca; though wouldn't make a matchday squad.

Personal life
In May 2018, Mayora was arrested for drink-driving.

Career statistics
.

Honours
Sport Loreto
Copa Perú: 2014

References

External links

1992 births
Living people
People from Pucallpa
Peruvian footballers
Association football forwards
Peruvian expatriate footballers
Expatriate footballers in Argentina
Peruvian expatriate sportspeople in Argentina
Copa Perú players
Peruvian Primera División players
Argentine Primera División players
Peruvian Segunda División players
Sport Loreto players
Unión Comercio footballers
Club Atlético Colón footballers
Deportivo Municipal footballers
Real Garcilaso footballers
Universidad Técnica de Cajamarca footballers
Deportivo Coopsol players